Greenwayodendron oliveri is a species of plant in the genus Greenwayodendron, and a member of the Annonaceae family, described by Bernard Verdcourt. According to Catalogue of Life Greenwayodendron oliveri does not have any known subspecies.

Distribution 
Greenwayodendron oliveri is mostly found in Africa in Sierra Leone, Liberia, Ivory Coast, Nigeria, Cameroon, Central African Republic, Gabon and Democratic Republic of the Congo.

This plant is found and in rainforests most in Sierra Leone and Eastern Nigeria.

''This plant is considered be native to Africa''

Medicine 
This plant has fibres and is used for bark medicine.

References

Annonaceae